The 1946–47 Norwegian 1. Divisjon season was the eighth season of ice hockey in Norway. Nine teams participated in the league, and Mode won the championship.

Regular season

External links 
 Norwegian Ice Hockey Federation

Nor
GET-ligaen seasons
1946–47 in Norwegian ice hockey